Chauncey Depew "Chum" Steele III (born February 16, 1944) is a former tennis player from the United States. His father, Chauncey Steele, Jr., also played tennis.

Steele competed at the US Open ten times and made three appearances at Wimbledon.

He worked as a stockbroker.

References

External links
 

1944 births
Living people
American male tennis players
Tennis people from California